The Party of Communist Unification in the Canaries was a communist party working for the political autonomy of the Canary Islands. PUCC appeared sometime in 1975, and held its first conference in 1978. PUCC originated from OPI a leftist split of the Communist Party of Spain. PUCC worked underground during caudillo Francisco Franco's Spanish State. The leader of PUCC was Paco Tovar Santos, and its internal bulletin was called Comunista ("Communist").

History
The party was founded in 1975 as a split of the Communist Party of Spain. The same year a member of the party, Antonio González Ramos, was killed by the Francoist State Spanish police.

In the 1977 general elections PUCC supported Frente Democrático de Izquierdas. In the second congress of PUCC in 1980, it changed its name to Movimiento de Izquierda Revolucionaria del Archipiélago Canario-PUCC. In 2012, PUCC was integrated in Communist Party of the People of Spain.

Bibliography
 Partido de Unificación Comunista de Canarias, Canarias entre atlantismo y africanismo, Las Palmas de Gran Canaria : s.n., 1978 25 p. ; 23 cm I conferencia insular.

References

Political parties in the Canary Islands
Left-wing nationalist parties
Defunct communist parties in Spain
Defunct nationalist parties in Spain
Canaries, Party of Communist Unification in the Canaries
Canarian nationalist parties
Anti-Francoism
Political parties established in 1975
Political parties disestablished in 2012
1975 establishments in Spain
2012 disestablishments in Spain